Robert Leeds may refer to:

Robert M. Leeds, American film and television director
Sex and the City characters#Robert Leeds, a fictional character on the Sex and the City television series
Robert Ledes, English politician of the late 14th century